Foodland is a Canadian chain of grocery stores founded in 1985. Its stores are located mostly in rural areas of Atlantic Canada and Ontario. Foodland stores are franchised neighbourhood supermarkets that focus on customer convenience and offering a wide selection of conventional supermarket products such as produce, meats, dairy products, frozen food, dry goods, baked goods and deli products.

Locations

New Brunswick

Current
 Bathurst
 Blackville
 Dalhousie
 Florenceville-Bristol 
 Grand Falls
 Minto
 Miramichi 
 Quispamsis
 Petitcodiac
 Rexton
 Sackville
 Grand Bay-Westfield

Former
 Edmundston
 Perth-Andover
 Tracadie–Sheila

Newfoundland and Labrador
 Arnold's Cove
 Badger's Quay
 Bay Bulls
 Bloomfield
 Bonavista
 Botwood
 Burgeo
 Bay Roberts
 Carbonear
 Carter's Cove
 Deer Lake
 Ferryland
 Gander
 Glovertown
 Harbour Breton
 Joe Batt's Arm
 Old Perlican
 Pasadena
 Placentia
 Port aux Basques
 Port au Choix
 Roddickton
 Springdale
 St. Anthony
 Summerford
 Torbay
 Twillingate
 Whitbourne

Nova Scotia

Current
 Annapolis Royal
 Berwick
 Bible Hill
 Chester
 Coldbrook
 Eskasoni First Nation
 Glace Bay
 Kentville
 Lunenburg
 Middleton
 Milford Station
 Saulnierville
 Sheet Harbour
 Springhill
 St. Peter's
 Stewiacke 
 Sydney Mines
 Tatamagouche
 Westville
 Weymouth

Former
 Amherst
 Greenwood

Ontario

 Ailsa Craig
 Amherstview
 Ayr
 Bancroft
 Bayfield
 Beaverton
 Beeton
 Belle River
 Belmont
 Bobcaygeon
 Bothwell
 Brampton
 Brechin
 Brights Grove
 Brussels
 Buckhorn
 Burford
 Caledon
 Callander
 Cannington
 Capreol
 Cayuga
 Clinton
 Coboconk
 Cobourg
 Colborne
 Coldwater
 Cookstown
 Corunna
 Craighurst
 Creemore

 Dorchester
 Dorset
 Dresden
 Dundalk
 Durham
 Dutton
 Eganville
 Elliot Lake
 Elmira
 Elmvale
 Erin
 Essex
 Exeter
 Forest
 Foxboro
 Frankford
 Garson
 Glencoe
 Greely
 Hagersville
 Haliburton
 Hamilton
 Hanover
 Havelock
 Ingersoll
 Ingleside
 Innisfil
 Iroquois
 Iroquois Falls
 Kirkland Lake
 Lakefield
 London
 Lion's Head
 Little Britain
 Little Current
 Lucan

 Mactier
 Madoc
 Markdale
 Mattawa
 Midland
 Millbrook
 Mindemoya
 Minden Hills
 Mount Albert
 Mount Forest
 Newcastle
 Niagara Falls
 Noëlville
 Northbrook
 Norwich
 Norwood
 Novar
 Omemee
 Orillia
 Orono
 Osgoode
 Oshawa
 Owen Sound
 Paisley
 Parkhill
 Penetanguishene
 Peterborough (2)
 Port Carling
 Port Perry
 Port Rowan
 Port Stanley
 Quinte West
 Ridgetown
 Rockwood
 Russell

 Schomberg
 Seaforth
 Shelburne
 Smithville
 South River
 Southampton
 St. Clements
 St. George
 St. Marys
 St. Thomas
 Stayner
 Stirling
 Stratford
 Sturgeon Falls
 Sundridge
 Sydenham
 Thornbury
 Thorold
 Tilbury
 Timmins
 Tobermory
 Toronto (4)
 Tottenham
 Verner
 Verona
 Victoria Harbour
 Vankleek Hill
 Vineland
 Walkerton
 Wasaga Beach
 Waterford
 Watford
 Wellington
 West Lorne
 Whitby
 Wiarton
 Wilberforce
 Winchester
 Wingham
 Woodstock
 Wyoming

Prince Edward Island
 Bloomfield
 Charlottetown

See also
List of Canadian supermarkets

References

External links
Official Foodland Site
Sobeys Corporate - Foodland

Supermarkets of Canada
1985 establishments in Canada
Retail companies established in 1985
Sobeys
Cuisine of Atlantic Canada
Food and drink companies based in Nova Scotia